The 2007–08 Euroleague was the 8th season of the professional basketball competition for elite clubs throughout Europe, organised by Euroleague Basketball Company, and it was the 51st season of the premier competition for European men's clubs overall. The 2007–08 season featured 24 competing teams. The Euroleague Regular Season draw was held on 30 June 2007, in Jesolo, Italy, during the inaugural Euroleague summer league. The official inauguration was held on October 22, at Hala Olivia in Gdańsk, Poland, before the season's opening game between Prokom Trefl Sopot and CSKA Moscow. The 2008 Final Four was held on May 2–4, 2008, at the Palacio de Deportes de la Comunidad de Madrid in Madrid, Spain. Russian power CSKA Moscow became the champion for the sixth time, placing them second in all-time European championships to Real Madrid.

Teams of the 2007–08 Euroleague

Teams details

Regular season 
The regular season began on October 22, 2007.

The first phase was a regular season, in which the competing teams were drawn into three groups, each containing eight teams. Each team played every other team in its group at home and away, resulting in 14 games for each team in the first stage. The top 5 teams in each group and the best sixth-placed team advanced to the next round. The complete list of tiebreakers was provided in the lead-in to the Regular Season results.

If one or more clubs were level on won-lost record, tiebreakers are applied in the following order:
 Head-to-head record in matches between the tied clubs
 Overall point difference in games between the tied clubs
 Overall point difference in all group matches (first tiebreaker if tied clubs were not in the same group)
 Points scored in all group matches
 Sum of quotients of points scored and points allowed in each group match

Group C

Top 16 
The surviving teams were divided into four groups of four teams each, and again a round robin system was adopted, resulting in 6 games each, with the two top teams advancing to the quarterfinals. Tiebreakers were identical to those used in the Regular Season.

The draw to set up the Top 16 groups was held on Monday, February 4, 2008 (the week after the end of the Regular Season), in Madrid.

The teams were placed into four pools, as follows:

Level 1: The three group winners, plus the top-ranked second-place team
 CSKA Moscow, Panathinaikos, Lietuvos Rytas, Real Madrid
Level 2: The remaining second-place teams, plus the top two third-place teams
 Maccabi Elite, Montepaschi Siena, Unicaja Málaga, Tau Cerámica
Level 3: The remaining third-place team, plus the three fourth-place teams
 FC Barcelona, Efes Pilsen, Žalgiris, Fenerbahçe Ülker
Level 4: The fifth-place teams, plus the top ranked sixth-place team
 Olympiacos, Aris, Partizan, Lottomatica Roma

Each Top 16 group included one team from each pool. The draw was conducted under the following restrictions:
 No more than two teams from the same Regular Season group could be placed in the same Top 16 group.
 No more than two teams from the same country could be placed in the same Top 16 group.
 If there is a conflict between these two restrictions, (1) would receive priority.

Another draw was held to determine the order of fixtures. In the cases of two teams from the same city in the Top 16 (Panathinaikos and Olympiacos, Efes Pilsen and Fenerbahçe), they were scheduled so that only one of the two teams would be at home in a given week.

Quarterfinals 

Each quarterfinal was a best-of-three (if third serie necessary) series between a first-place team in the Top 16 and a second-place team from a different group, with the first-place team receiving home advantage. All opening games were played on April 1, 2008, and all second games were played on April 3. The deciding third games were played on April 9 and April 10.

|}

Final four 

The Final Four is the last phase of each Euroleague season, and is held over a weekend. The semifinal games are played on Friday evening. Sunday starts with the third-place game, followed by the championship final.

Semifinals 
May 2, Palacio de Deportes de la Comunidad de Madrid, Madrid

|}

3rd place game 
May 4, Palacio de Deportes de la Comunidad de Madrid, Madrid

|}

Final 
May 4, Palacio de Deportes de la Comunidad de Madrid, Madrid

|}

Final standings

Final Four 2008 MVP 
 Trajan Langdon (CSKA Moscow)

Individual statistics

Rating

Points

Rebounds

Assists

Other Stats

Game highs

Awards

Euroleague 2007–08 MVP 
  Ramūnas Šiškauskas (  CSKA Moscow )

Euroleague 2007–08 Final Four MVP 
  Trajan Langdon (  CSKA Moscow )

Euroleague 2007–08 Finals Top Scorer 
  Will Bynum (  Maccbi Tel Aviv )

All-Euroleague Team 2007–08

Rising Star 
  Danilo Gallinari (  Armani Jeans Milano )

Best Defender 
  Dimitris Diamantidis (  Panathinaikos )

Top Scorer (Alphonso Ford Trophy) 
  Marc Salyers (  Roanne )

Coach of the Year (Alexander Gomelsky Award) 
  Ettore Messina (  CSKA Moscow )

Club Executive of the Year 
  Ferdinando Minucci (  Montepaschi Siena )

Regular season

Top 16

Playoffs

MVP of the Month

See also 
 Euroleague 2007–08 Final
 ULEB Cup 2007–08
 EuroCup 2007–08
 EuroLeague Women 2007–08

References and notes 

 
EuroLeague seasons